Nikolay Nikolov (born 26 January 1981) is a Bulgarian footballer who plays as a defender.

Career
Nikolov started your career in Levski Sofia. After that he played for Balkan Botevgrad, Levski-Spartak, Levski Sofia, Pirin Gotse Delchev, Chernomorets, Montana, and Armenian club Banants.

On 30 January 2017, Nikolov joined Marek Dupnitsa.  He left the club at the end of the 2017–18 season.

References

External links
 

1981 births
Living people
Footballers from Sofia
Bulgarian footballers
PFC Pirin Gotse Delchev players
PFC Levski Sofia players
PFC Chernomorets Burgas players
FC Montana players
FC Urartu players
FC Lokomotiv 1929 Sofia players
PFC Marek Dupnitsa players
FC Septemvri Sofia players
FC Levski Karlovo players
First Professional Football League (Bulgaria) players
Second Professional Football League (Bulgaria) players
Armenian Premier League players
Bulgarian expatriate footballers
Bulgarian expatriate sportspeople in Armenia
Expatriate footballers in Armenia
Association football central defenders